Allah Ke Banday is a 2010 Indian Hindi-language crime drama film produced by Ravi Walia and directed by Faruk Kabir.

Plot
Allah Ke Banday tells the tale of two 12-year-old boys (Vijay and Yakub) who grow up in the slums of India. Wanting to make a name for themselves in the mafia world, they start delivering drugs. Their friend (Zakir Hussain) dresses as a transgender, in an act where they loot people. Things go wrong when they are sent to a juvenile reformatory after being wrongly convicted for a murder. They learn life is much tougher in the reformatory than the world they came from. They are tortured by the warden and senior inmates. But instead of reforming they develop a more sinister plan in their quest for ultimate power.

Cast
Sharman Joshi as Vijay Kamble
Faruk Kabir as Yakub
Naseeruddin Shah as Warden
Atul Kulkarni as Ashwani
Anjana Sukhani as Sandhya
Rukhsar Rehman as Nirmala
Zakir Hussain as Ramesh
Varun Bhagwat
Saksham Kulkarni as Vitthal
Ajaz Khan as Nana chauhan
Suhasini Mulay as Mother
Vikram Gokhale as Sheryaar
Madan Deodhar as Vijay Kamble (childhood)
Asif khan as don

Soundtrack

Accolades

References

Further reading
 http://www.bollywoodhungama.com/moviemicro/criticreview/id/503075
 
 
 India Express

External links
 
 Allah Ke Banday at NDTV
 

2010 films
Indian crime drama films
2010s Hindi-language films
2010 directorial debut films
Hindi-language crime films
Films scored by Chirantan Bhatt
Films scored by Kailash Kher
Films scored by Ishq Bector
Films set in prison
Indian gangster films
Films about organised crime in India